O'Kane Canyon is a steep-walled canyon at the head of O'Kane Glacier, indenting the east side of Eisenhower Range between Mount Baxter and Eskimo Point, in Victoria Land. Named by the Southern Party of New Zealand Geological Survey Antarctic Expedition (NZGSAE), 1962–63, for H.D. O'Kane, photographer at Scott Base, 1961–62. O'Kane had made several reconnaissance flights to provide aerial photographs of the area.

Canyons and gorges of Antarctica
Landforms of Victoria Land
Scott Coast